Európa Expressz (alt. Europa Express) is a Hungarian action-thriller film made in 1999.

Plot
Zavarov, a psychotic Russian thief who likes to steal religious icons, is on the run from a group of undercover cops who don't know Zavarov has planted an informant amongst them. Zavarov makes his getaway on a train, only to discover the police were able to board before leaving the station. He hijacks the train and demands passage to Austria. The police cleverly run the train in a loop and mask a Hungarian train station as if it were in Nickelsdorf, Austria (the actual station filmed is in Szabadbattyán). This fools Zavarov into thinking he is in Austria, and when he exits the train, the police surround him.

Cast
 András Stohl - Béci
 Kata Dobó -  Edit
 Iván Kamarás -  Jimmy
 Tibor Szilágyi - Lieutenant Colonel Papp
 Zoltán Rátóti - Zavarov
 László Jászai Jr. - Golyó
 András Gáspár -  Kenõ
 Géza Kaszás - Second in Command
 Ödön Rubold -  Ticket inspector
 András Schlanger - Jenõke
 Ádám Rajhona -  Civilian
 Péter Végh -  Hadházy
 Dorka Gryllus - Student

Awards
 Nominations for a Golden Slate in the 2000 Csapnivaló Awards for Best Hungarian Actor (Zoltán Rátóti) and Best Hungarian Actress (Kata Dobó).

References

External links
 

Hungarian thriller films
1990s Hungarian-language films
1999 films
1999 action thriller films
Films set on trains